Feričanci is a municipality in Osijek-Baranja County, Croatia.

There are a total of 2,134 inhabitants (census 2011), in the following settlements:
 Feričanci, population 1,626
 Gazije, population 53
 Valenovac, population 185
 Vučjak Feričanački, population 270

97% of the population are Croats (2011 census).

Name 
The name of the village in Serbo-Croatian is plural. In German, the village was called also "Feritschanze".

References

Municipalities of Croatia